The alii nui of Oahu was the sovereign and supreme ruler of one of the four main Hawaiian Islands. The monarchs of the Island of Oahu, like those of the other islands, claim descent from Wākea. 

Nanaulu, a fourteenth generation descendant of Wakea was the ancestor of Kumuhonua, 1st known King of Oahu, brother of Moikeha King of Kauai of the second dynasty. In 1783, Oahu was conquered by the King Kahekili II of Maui whose son Kalanikūpule was, in turn, conquered by King Kamehameha I in 1795 at the Battle of Nuʻuanu. Many times the kings of Oahu had hegemony over the island of Molokai and used it as summer getaway. It was Oahu who brought forth the first Mo'iwahine or Queen regnant of any of the Hawaiian Islands.

List of alii nui of Oahu
 Maweke
 Mulielealiʻi
 Kumuhonua
 Elepuʻukahonua 
 Ho'okupohokano 
 Nawele
 Lakona 
 Kapae-a-Lakona
 Haka of Oahu
 Maʻilikākahi
 Kālonaiki
 Piliwale
 Kūkaniloko 
 Kalaimanuia
 Kūamanuia
 Kahikapuamanuia
 Kākuhihewa
 Kānekapu a Kākuhihewa
 Kaʻihikapu a Kākuhihewa, 1640-1660
 Kahoʻowahaokalani, 1660-1680
 Kauākahiakahoʻowaha, 1680-1690
 Kūaliʻi Kunuiakea Kuikealaikauaokalani, 1690-1730 A.D.
 Kapiiohookalani, 1730–1737
 Kanahāokalani, 1737–1738
 Peleʻioholani (King of Kauai 1730–1770), 1738–1770
 Kūmahana, 1770–1773
 Kahahana, 1773–1783
Conquered by Maui and ruled by Kahekili II and Kalanikūpule 1783–1795
Conquered by Kamehameha I in 1795

See also
Ancient Hawaii
Kingdom of Hawaii

References
 Oahu (Kingdom)

Royalty of Oahu
Oahu
Oahu
Native Hawaiian people
People from Hawaii
Hawaiiana
Lists of people from Hawaii
Hawaiian monarchs
Polynesian titles